Anna Maria Krupka (born 30 October 1981) is a Polish politician who is a Member of the Sejm.

Biography
Krupka graduated at the Institute of Sociology of the University of Warsaw. She engaged in political activities within the framework of Law and Justice, becoming a full-time employee of the party. In 2014 Krupka was elected to the Masovian Regional Assembly. In the parliamentary elections in 2015, Krupka ran for the Sejm in the Kielce district. She was elected with 27 568 votes.

Krupka, a state secretary for sports and culture, got into a debate with Konrad Berkowicz and Dawid Lewick, both members of the far-right Confederation Liberty and Independence party. During the debate over proposed restitution for Jewish Holocaust victims and their families, Berkowicz and Lewick said Krupka and her party represented "Poland, not Polin," the latter being the country's name in Hebrew. While Krupka was speaking Lewick placed a Kippah on her head, saying that he party "kneel before the Jews, they sell the country for $300 billion."

References

1981 births
Living people
Members of the Polish Sejm 2015–2019
Members of the Polish Sejm 2019–2023
Law and Justice politicians
University of Warsaw alumni
Women members of the Sejm of the Republic of Poland
21st-century Polish women politicians